This is a list of seasons played by Aberdeen Football Club from 1903 to the present day. It details the club's achievements in major competitions, and the top league goal scorers for each season. Records of minor competitions such as the Aberdeenshire Cup and Northern League are not included.

The club has won the Scottish Football League championship 4 times, most recently in 1985. In addition, Aberdeen has won 7 Scottish Cup titles, the Scottish League Cup six times and the European Cup Winners' Cup once.

History
The club was formed in 1903 after an amalgamation of three Aberdeen-based football clubs, Orion, Aberdeen and Victoria United. An application to join the Scottish Football League in 1903 was defeated in a vote of member clubs, so the club spent its first season in the Northern League. In 1904, Aberdeen was elected to the Second Division. Despite finishing 7th, they were elected to the First Division in time for the 1905-06 season, where they have remained since, having never been relegated.

Aberdeen have finished bottom of the league on two occasions, 1916–17 and 1999-2000. They were spared relegation in 1917 after having to withdraw from the league because of World War I. In 2000, they avoided a play-off against the second and third place teams in the First Division because Falkirk's ground did not comply with SPL regulations.

In 1983, Aberdeen became the second Scottish club to win the European Cup Winners' Cup, defeating Real Madrid in the final. Later that year, they became the first and only Scottish club to win the UEFA Super Cup.

Seasons

Key

Key to league record
Pld = Played
W = Games won
D = Games drawn
L = Games lost
GF = Goals for
GA = Goals against
Pts = Points
Pos = Final position

Key to rounds
Group = Group stage
PR2 = Preliminary Round 2
QR3 = Qualifying Round 3
R1 = Round 1
R2 = Round 2
R3 = Round 3
R4 = Round 4
R5 = Round 5
R6 = Round 6
QF = Quarter-finals
SF = Semi-finals
Final = Runners-up
Winners = Winners

See also
Aberdeen F.C. in European football
History of Aberdeen F.C.
List of Aberdeen F.C. records and statistics

Notes

References

External links 
 Scottish Cup Archive
 Scottish League Archives
 League Cup Archive

Seasons
 
Aberdeen
Seasons